Khvajeh Kola or Khvajeh Kala may refer to:
 Khvajeh Kola, Babol Kenar, Babol County
 Khvajeh Kola, Bandpey-ye Sharqi, Babol County